For other inhabited localities of the same name, see Samoylovka

Samoylovka is a rural locality (a village) in Pervomaysky Selsoviet, Meleuzovsky District, Bashkortostan, Russia. The population was 273 as of 2010. There are 11 streets.

Geography 
Samoylovka is located 7 km east of Meleuz (the district's administrative centre) by road. Tyulyakovo is the nearest rural locality.

References 

Rural localities in Meleuzovsky District